Student (Stýdent) is a 2012 Kazakhstani drama film directed by Darezhan Omirbaev. It is an adaptation of Fyodor Dostoyevsky's 1866 novel Crime and Punishment. The film competed in the Un Certain Regard section at the 2012 Cannes Film Festival.

Reception
Leslie Felperin of Variety wrote: "As he did with Killer, Omirbayev once again offers a quietly scathing portrait of his homeland, which, on the evidence here, is on the verge of losing its soul in the pursuit of Range Rovers, banal soap operas and other ephemeral pleasures. ... [T]here's much to admire in the film's elegantly classical tempo and the way Omirbayev achieves so much with so little[.]"

References

External links
 

2012 films
2012 drama films
Kazakhstani drama films
Kazakh-language films
Films based on Crime and Punishment
Films directed by Darezhan Omirbaev